In Tibetan Buddhism, Vajravārāhī ("The Diamond Sow",  Dorje Pakmo) is a wrathful form of Vajrayogini associated particularly with the Cakrasaṃvara Tantra, where she is paired in yab-yum with the Heruka Cakrasaṃvara. Judith Simmer-Brown writes that "Vajravārāhī's iconography is very similar to that of Vajrayoginī, but she often has more prominent fangs and a more wrathful expression, and she prominently displays a sow's head above her right ear."

Although there are practices of Vajravārāhī in all schools of Tibetan Buddhism, she is particularly associated with the Kagyu school and is one of the main yidam practices of that school. Her tulkus, the Samding Dorje Phagmo, are associated with the Bodongpa, a little-known school of Tibetan Buddhism.

Iconography
Vajravārāhī is one of the most popular female Tantric deities in all traditions of Tibetan Buddhism. Although there are several forms, the basic iconography is that she has one face, (usually) two hands and two legs, is usually red in colour, and standing in a dancing posture on a human corpse. The distinguishing iconographic attribute is a sow head (varahi) placed either on the right side of her head or on the top of her head. Because of this sow's head, sometimes she is called the 'two-faced' Vajrayogini (shal nyi ma).

Outline
In Buddhist tantric texts, Vajravarahi and Cakrasamvara defeat the embodiments of ego, Bhairava and Kali, in a battle that sees each side pitting twenty-four emanations of themselves against the other in twenty-four sacred sites.

Incarnation lineages

Samding Dorje Phagmo

One tulku lineage associated with Vajravarahi is that of Samding Dorje Phagmo, who first manifested at Samding Monastery in 1717 in order to tame Yamdrok Lake, a sacred lake as well as a dangerous flashpoint for massive flooding events in Tibet.

However, her effects were said to be more practical: as abbess of Samding, it is said that she stopped the invasion of the Dzungars, who were described as terrified of her great siddhi powers. When faced with her anger - which it is  said she expressed by turning the 80 śrāmaṇerīs under her care into furious wild sows - they left the goods and valuables they had plundered as offerings at her monastery and fled the region.

Other incarnation lineages 
There also is a Dorje Phagmo tulku in Bhutan recognized by the Sakya lama Rikey Jatrel, considered an incarnation of Thang Tong Gyalpo, who was a close associate of Chökyi Drönma despite his political tensions with the Bodongpa lineage heads of the time. She is currently a member of the monastic community of Thangtong Dewachen Dupthop Nunnery at Zilingkha in Thimphu, which follows the Nyingma and the Shangpa Kagyu traditions.

Footnotes

References

Further reading

Pig-faced women
Vajrayogini
Dakinis